Pi Aquarii, Latinized from π Aquarii, is the Bayer designation for a binary star in the equatorial constellation of Aquarius. This system has an apparent visual magnitude of a mean apparent magnitude of +4.57.

This is a binary star system with an orbital period of 84.1 days. The primary component is a B1 giant or subgiant star. This is a large star with nearly eleven times the mass and over six times the radius of the Sun. Pi Aquarii shines about 7,300 times as brightly as the Sun. The nature of the secondary is unknown; some analyses have suggested it is an A- or F-type main-sequence star, but the possibility of a white dwarf has not been ruled out.

Pi Aquarii is notable for having undergone a transition from a Be star (showing hydrogen emission lines) into an ordinary B-type star. It is classified as a Gamma Cassiopeiae type variable star and its brightness varies from magnitude +4.45 to +4.71; a range of 0.28. The dominant variability period,  days, is nearly the same as the orbital period.  Pi Aquarii has a reasonable chance of becoming a supernova some day.

In culture
Pi Aquarii was called Seat  by Grotius in the 17th century, but the name has rarely been used since.

In the catalogue of stars in the Calendarium of Al Achsasi al Mouakket, this star was designated Wasat al Achbiya (وسط الأخبية - wasath al ahbiyah), which was translated into Latin as Media Tabernaculorum, meaning the middle of luck of the homes (tents). This star, along with γ Aqr (Sadachbia), ζ Aqr (Sadaltager / Achr al Achbiya) and η Aqr (Hydria), were al Aḣbiyah (الأخبية), the Tent.

References

External links
 Image Pi Aquarii

B-type giants
B-type subgiants
Emission-line stars
Gamma Cassiopeiae variable stars
Binary stars

Aquarius (constellation)
BD+00 4872
Aquarii, Pi
Aquarii, 052
212571
110672
8539
Seat